Blackpaper was a Hong Kong magazine, founded by Roy Tsui, Luk Ka Chun and Yiu Ka Ho in 2009, owned by Most Kwai Chung. Blackpaper is published on every 1st and 15th of each month, sold at 7-Eleven only. The magazine is printed on an A5 paper and folded into half. In 2010, it achieved 160 thousand copies in Hong Kong. Besides the magazine, Blackpaper extends their business into merchandise like T-shirts and books.

The magazine ceased its publication on 1 January 2017.

Rationale 

Blackpaper publishes content in short for the local new generation, mostly post-80s and post-90s, in order to encourage them to read more. It features celebrities as cover people, especially from the local entertainment sphere. Sometimes, they would invite political figures.

Changes of Blackpaper throughout the years 
Each year, the main theme of Blackpaper changes but it mainly contains 'black interview' (interviews with celebrities), 'black survey' (results of survey related to the theme of that issue) and 'black sentence' (sarcastic sentences based on the theme of that issue).

2010 Faux Literature Magazine (偽文學雜誌)
Every issue was titled with a single word and only 'black sentence' as its contents. There was no limit on the colour tone.

2011 Faux Entertainment Magazine(偽娛樂雜誌)
Every issue was titled with a single word, with 'black sentence' and 'black interview'. The cover was in greyscale, including the portraits of the interviewees in 'black interview'.

2012 Faux Advertisement Magazine(偽廣告雜誌)
Every issue was titled with a two-word vocabulary. Most of the issues were composed of 'black sentence' and 'black interview'. Some of them were composed with other kinds of verbal creation, such as drafts and graphics. On the covers, portraits of interviewees were in greyscale and the title is in colour.

2013 Faux Love (Romantic) Magazine(偽愛情雜誌)
The titles of the issues started by 'Hate ... the most', such as 'Hate hypocrites the most', in local film director Wong Jing's issue. Issues were composed of 'black sentence', 'black interview' and 'black statistic'. The covers are printed in colour, but the interviewees' full length photos are in greyscale.

2014 Faux Times Magazine(偽時代雜誌)
The titles of the issues were 'Man of the ...', such as 'Man of Cantonese'. Every issue was composed of 'black sentence' and 'black interview'. Covers were printed with the profile shots of the interviewees in colour.

Special Edition (September 2012)
This edition features the 11 reasons why the Moral and National Education has to be retracted. The issue was distributed in the related protest at the Central Government Complex, Tamar, Hong Kong.

Issues related to political affairs
Topics related to Hong Kong politics are their main focus, especially on June Forth event and election in Hong Kong.
 
Every year, Blackpaper titles 'June Fourth' (六四), the Tiananmen Square protests of 1989, as its first issue of June, in order to remind the public to struggle for the rehabilitation of  victims. Young generation can also get to know more about the incident.
 
After the Hong Kong Chief Executive election of 2012, Blackpaper published an issue with a single word, 'Darkness' (黑暗), expressing the distrust towards Leung Chun-ying, the new chief executive. Moreover, another issue published in August 2012 disapproved the 2012 Hong Kong legislative election. Blackpaper was in attempt to call for a fair electoral system, a universal suffrage in Hong Kong.

Influence

Politics 
Some celebrities from the celebrities from local entertainment sphere were asked about the issues happened in Hong Kong Society. For instance, Mag Lam, a local diva, expressed her opinion towards education in Hong Kong. As young adults treated those celebrities as their idols, through this celebrity effect, Blackpaper aroused teenagers' interest in politics in a certain extent.

Blackpaper was even used in protest, which directly shows its influence in Hong Kong politics.  During the protest against Moral and National Education in Hong Kong in 2012, the founders of Blackpaper issued a special edition of Blackpaper, with the word 'Retract' (撤回) printed on it. Copies of this issue of Blackpaper were distributed to protesters outside the Central Government Complex on 7 September. Members and supporters of Scholarism (學民思潮) held up the Blackpaper during the protest, showing their determination. Some students even put Blackpaper on their school bulletin board so as to show their concerns on the controversy to schools.

During the debate of Copyright (Amendment) Bill 2011 in Hong Kong, which the public treated as Internet Article 23, Blackpaper published an issue called 'Parody'(惡搞), with some paper glasses attached to that issue. It invited readers to wear them as real glasses. Later, many people posted photos of their recreated images with the paper glasses on Facebook, including local artist, Shawn Yue and the member of the Legislative Council of Hong Kong, James Tien Pei-chun. As people who joined the event actually involved in the creation of derivative works, this show their support towards derivative works.

Culture

Derivative works
Due to its success among teenagers, many derivative works of Blackpaper started to appear. People took its style and design as reference and created various 'fraux-Blackpaper' to attract teenagers. For example, souvenirs distributed by Beacon College's tutor Yat Yan Lam and dessert recipes in local convenience stores.

Language
Blackpaper used Cantonese and words commonly known among teenagers like 'plastic' (膠) and 'blow' (吹), which can be vulgar. This further spreads and consolidates the usage of those words in society.

Criticism of Blackpaper
The deliberate short length in each issue led to criticism by netizens of Blackpaper and 100Most, another magazine that was also founded by the same group, that these magazines will degrade teenagers' ability in writing long article. However, the founder responded that they only aimed at helping readers to become a person who pays more attention to the society and self through reading the Blackpaper.

References

External links

 

2009 establishments in Hong Kong
2017 disestablishments in Hong Kong
Biweekly magazines published in Hong Kong
Celebrity magazines
Chinese-language magazines
Defunct magazines published in Hong Kong
Local interest magazines
Magazines established in 2009
Magazines disestablished in 2017
Most Kwai Chung
Youth magazines